Lebogang Ditsele (born 20 April 1996) is a Botswanan football midfielder who currently plays for Jwaneng Galaxy.

References

1996 births
Living people
Botswana footballers
Botswana international footballers
Township Rollers F.C. players
Jwaneng Galaxy F.C. players
Gilport Lions F.C. players
Highlands Park F.C. players
Association football midfielders
Botswana expatriate footballers
Expatriate soccer players in South Africa
Botswana expatriate sportspeople in South Africa
South African Premier Division players
National First Division players